The 9th New York Cavalry Regiment was a cavalry regiment that served in the Union Army during the American Civil War. It is also known as the Stoneman Cavalry, named after New York-born cavalry general George Stoneman.

Service
The regiment was organized in Westfield, New York and was mustered out of service in July 1865.

Commanding officers
Colonel John Beardsley
Colonel William H. Sackett
Colonel George Sylvester Nichols

See also

List of New York Civil War regiments

References

Further reading
Cheney, Newel. History of the Ninth Regiment, New York Volunteer Cavalry: War of 1861 to 1865. N.Y.: Poland Center, 1901.

External links
New York State Military Museum and Veterans Research Center - Civil War - 9th Cavalry Regiment — History, photographs, table of battles and casualties, Civil War newspaper clippings, and historical sketch for the 9th New York Volunteer Cavalry Regiment.

Cavalry 009
1861 establishments in New York (state)
Military units and formations established in 1861
Military units and formations disestablished in 1865